Superball Tded99 is a Muay Thai fighter.

Titles and accomplishments
 Professional Boxing Association of Thailand (PAT)
 2014 Thailand 122 lbs Champion
International Federation of Muaythai Associations
 2021 IFMA World Championships -63.5 kg 
World Games
 2022 IFMA Muay Thai at the World Games -63.5 kg

Fight record

|-  style="background:#cfc;"
| 2023-02-17|| Win ||align=left| Kongklai AnnyMuayThai || ONE Friday Fights 5, Lumpinee Stadium || Bangkok, Thailand || Decision (Unanimous) || 3 || 3:00
|-  style="background:#cfc"
| 2023-01-09 || Win ||align=left| PhetUtong Or.Kwanmuang || Muay Thai Pantamit || Chiang Rai province, Thailand || KO (Low kicks) || 3 ||

|-  style="background:#cfc;"
| 2022-05-12 || Win ||align=left| Rungkit Wor.Sanprapai ||Petchyindee, Rajadamnern Stadium || Bangkok, Thailand ||  Decision  || 5 || 3:00
|-  style="background:#fbb;"
| 2022-04-07|| Loss ||align=left| Superlek Kiatmuu9 ||  Petchyindee, Rajadamnern Stadium || Bangkok, Thailand || Decision (Unanimous) || 5 || 3:00
|-
! style=background:white colspan=9 |
|-  style="background:#cfc;"
| 2021-12-30|| Win||align=left| Rungkit Wor.Sanprapai ||Muay Thai SAT Super Fight WiteetinThai || Phuket, Thailand || Decision||5  ||3:00
|-  style="background:#cfc"
| 2021-03-13 || Win||align=left| Rangkhao Wor.Sangprapai|| Majujaya Muay Thai, Temporary Outdoors Stadium || Pattani, Thailand || KO (left hook) || 4||
|-  style="background:#cfc"
| 2020-11-07 || Win||align=left| Kaonar P.K. Saenchai Muaythaigym || SAT HERO SERIES, World Siam Stadium || Bangkok, Thailand || Decision || 5|| 3:00
|-  style="background:#cfc"
| 2020-10-03 || Win||align=left| Phet Utong Or. Kwanmuang || Omnoi Stadium || Samut Sakhon, Thailand || Decision || 5|| 3:00
|-  style="background:#c5d2ea;"
| 2020-01-31|| Draw ||align=left| Mongkolpetch Petchyindee || Phuket Super Fight Real Muay Thai || Mueang Phuket District, Thailand || Decision || 5||3:00
|-  style="background:#fbb;"
| 2019-12-23|| Loss ||align=left| Superlek Kiatmuu9 || Rajadamnern 74th Anniversary, Rajadamnern Stadium ||Bangkok, Thailand || Decision (Unanimous)|| 5 || 3:00
|-  style="background:#cfc;"
| 2019-11-07|| Win ||align=left| Yamin PK.Saenchaimuaythaigym || Rajadamnern Stadium || Bangkok, Thailand || Decision || 5 || 3:00
|-  style="background:#cfc;"
| 2019-09-02|| Win ||align=left| Yamin PK.Saenchaimuaythaigym || Rajadamnern Stadium || Bangkok, Thailand || KO (Left Straight)|| 2 ||
|-  style="background:#fbb;"
| 2019-05-30|| Loss ||align=left| Yamin PK.Saenchaimuaythaigym || Rajadamnern Stadium || Bangkok, Thailand || KO (Right High kick)|| 2 ||
|- style="background:#fbb;"
| 2019-04-25|| Loss ||align=left| Kaonar P.K.SaenchaiMuaythaiGym || Rajadamnern Stadium || Bangkok, Thailand || Decision || 5 || 3:00
|-  style="background:#cfc;"
| 2019-02-07|| Win ||align=left| Phet Utong Or. Kwanmuang || Rajadamnern Stadium || Bangkok, Thailand || Decision || 5 || 3:00
|-  style="background:#cfc;"
| 2018-12-21|| Win ||align=left| Phet Utong Or. Kwanmuang || Rajadamnern Stadium || Bangkok, Thailand || Decision || 5 || 3:00
|-  style="background:#cfc;"
| 2018-11-29|| Win ||align=left| Phet Utong Or. Kwanmuang || Rajadamnern Stadium || Bangkok, Thailand || Decision || 5 || 3:00
|- style="background:#fbb;"
| 2018-11-07|| Loss ||align=left| Kaonar P.K.SaenchaiMuaythaiGym || Rajadamnern Stadium || Bangkok, Thailand || Decision || 5 || 3:00
|-  style="background:#cfc;"
| 2018-10-04|| Win ||align=left| Yamin PK.Saenchaimuaythaigym || Rajadamnern Stadium || Bangkok, Thailand || Decision || 5 || 3:00
|-  style="background:#cfc;"
| 2018-05-23|| Win ||align=left|  Yok Parunchai || Rajadamnern Stadium || Bangkok, Thailand || Decision || 5 || 3:00
|-  style="background:#fbb;"
| 2016-12-22|| Loss ||align=left| Kaimukkao Por.Thairongruangkamai|| Rajadamnern Stadium || Bangkok, Thailand || KO (Right High Kick) || 4 ||
|-  style="background:#cfc;"
| 2016-11-17|| Win ||align=left|  Extra Sitworaphat || Rajadamnern Stadium || Bangkok, Thailand || Decision || 5 || 3:00
|-  style="background:#fbb;"
| 2016-09-29|| Loss ||align=left| Bangpleenoi 96Penang || Rajadamnern Stadium || Bangkok, Thailand || Decision || 5 || 3:00
|-  style="background:#cfc;"
| 2016-08-29|| Win ||align=left|  Jompichit Chuwattana  || Rajadamnern Stadium || Bangkok, Thailand || Decision || 5 || 3:00
|-  style="background:#cfc;"
| 2016-06-27|| Win ||align=left|  Jompichit Chuwattana  || Rajadamnern Stadium || Bangkok, Thailand || Decision || 5 || 3:00
|-  style="background:#cfc;"
| 2016-05-30|| Win ||align=left|  Jemsak Buriram  || Rajadamnern Stadium || Bangkok, Thailand || Decision || 5 || 3:00
|- style="background:#cfc;"
| 2016-03-07|| Win ||align=left| Phetngam Kiatkamphon|| Rajadamnern Stadium || Bangkok, Thailand || Decision || 5 || 3:00
|- style="background:#fbb;"
| 2015-11-29|| Loss ||align=left| Phetsongkom Sitjaroensub ||  || Chachoengsao Province, Thailand || Decision || 5 || 3:00
|- style="background:#cfc;"
| 2015-11-08|| Win ||align=left| Sit Ek Aor.Bualerd || Rangsit Stadium || Thailand || Decision || 5 || 3:00
|- style="background:#cfc;"
| 2015-09-27|| Win ||align=left| Wanchana Aor.Boonchuay || Rangsit Stadium || Thailand || Decision || 5 || 3:00
|- style="background:#fbb;"
| 2015-08-23|| Loss ||align=left| Klasuek Phetjinda || Rangsit Stadium || Thailand || KO || 3 ||
|- style="background:#cfc;"
| 2015-07-26|| Win ||align=left| Palangthip Nor Sripheung || Ubon Ratchathani Boxing Stadium || Ubon Ratchathani, Thailand || Decision || 5 || 3:00
|- style="background:#cfc;"
| 2015-05-13|| Win ||align=left| Sit Ek Aor.Bualerd || Rajadamnern Stadium || Bangkok, Thailand || Decision || 5 || 3:00
|- style="background:#fbb;"
| 2015-04-02|| Loss ||align=left| Songkom Sakhomsin || Rajadamnern Stadium || Bangkok, Thailand || Decision || 5 || 3:00
|- style="background:#cfc;"
| 2015-03-06|| Win ||align=left| Kotchasan Wor.Wiwattananont || Lumpinee Stadium || Bangkok, Thailand || Decision || 5 || 3:00
|- style="background:#cfc;"
| 2015-01-26|| Win ||align=left| Paaeteng Kiatpolthip || Rajadamnern Stadium || Bangkok, Thailand || Decision || 5 || 3:00
|- style="background:#cfc;"
| 2015-01-04|| Win ||align=left| Songkom Sakhomsin || Rangsit Stadium || Thailand || Decision || 5 || 3:00
|- style="background:#fbb;"
| 2014-11-17|| Loss ||align=left| Detsakda Phukongyatsuepudomsuk || Rajadamnern Stadium || Bangkok, Thailand || Decision || 5 || 3:00
|- style="background:#fbb;"
| 2014-10-09|| Loss ||align=left| Surachai Nayoksanya || Rajadamnern Stadium || Bangkok, Thailand || KO || 4 ||
|- style="background:#cfc;"
| 2014-07-15|| Win ||align=left| Thong Puideenaidee || Lumpinee Stadium || Bangkok, Thailand || Decision || 5 || 3:00
|- style="background:#cfc;"
| 2014-06-24|| Win ||align=left| Bangpleenoi 96Penang || Lumpinee Stadium || Bangkok, Thailand || TKO (Knees) || 3 ||
|- style="background:#fbb;"
| 2014-05-06|| Loss ||align=left| Bangpleenoi 96Penang || Lumpinee Stadium || Bangkok, Thailand || Decision || 5 || 3:00
|- style="background:#cfc;"
| 2014-04-11|| Win ||align=left| Choknumchai Sitjakong || Rajadamnern Stadium || Bangkok, Thailand || KO (Left Hook) || 2 ||  
|-
! style=background:white colspan=9 |
|- style="background:#cfc;"
| 2014-03-11|| Win ||align=left| Wanchana Aor.Boonchuay || Lumpinee Stadium || Bangkok, Thailand || Decision || 5 || 3:00
|- style="background:#fbb;"
| 2014-02-04|| Loss ||align=left| Eakmongkol Kaiyanghadaogym || Rajadamnern Stadium || Bangkok, Thailand || KO (Sweep to head kick)|| 4 ||
|- style="background:#fbb;"
| 2014-01-07|| Loss ||align=left| Teeyai Kiatchongkao || Rajadamnern Stadium || Bangkok, Thailand || Decision || 5 || 3:00
 
|-
| colspan=9 | Legend:    

|-  style="background:#fbb;"
| 2022-07-17||Loss||align=left| Igor Liubchenko ||IFMA at the 2022 World Games, Final|| Birmingham, Alabama, United States || Decision (29:29)|| 3 ||3:00 
|-
! style=background:white colspan=9 |

|-  style="background:#cfc;"
| 2022-07-16|| Win ||align=left| Nouredine Samir ||IFMA at the 2022 World Games, Semi Finals|| Birmingham, Alabama, United States || Decision (29:28) || 3 ||3:00

|-  style="background:#cfc;"
| 2022-07-15||Win||align=left| Lukas Mandinec ||IFMA at the 2022 World Games, Quarter Finals|| Birmingham, Alabama, United States || Decision (30:26) || 3 ||3:00

|-  style="background:#cfc;"
| 2021-12-11 ||Win ||align=left| Igor Liubchenko || 2021 IFMA World Championships, Final || Bangkok, Thailand || Decision || 3 ||
|-
! style=background:white colspan=9 |

|-  style="background:#cfc;"
| 2021-12-10 || Win ||align=left| Aik Begian || 2021 IFMA World Championships, Semi Finals || Bangkok, Thailand || Decision || 3 ||
|-  style="background:#cfc;"
| 2021-12-09 || Win ||align=left| Lorenzo Rossetti || 2021 IFMA World Championships, Quarter Finals || Bangkok, Thailand || Decision || 3 ||

|-  style="background:#cfc;"
| 2021-12-08 || Win ||align=left| László István Kurdy || 2021 IFMA World Championships, Round 2 || Bangkok, Thailand || KO || ||
|-
| colspan=9 | Legend:

References

1996 births
Superball Tded99
ONE Championship kickboxers
Living people
Superball Tded99
Superball Tded99